Ancus is a genus of beetles in the family Carabidae, containing the following species:

 Ancus bicornutus (Putzeys, 1861)
 Ancus carniceps Andrewes, 1936
 Ancus depressifrons Putzeys, 1866
 Ancus excavaticeps Putzeys, 1866
 Ancus heteromorphus Putzeys, 1866
 Ancus sulcicollis Putzeys, 1866

References

Scaritinae